The Lune River is a perennial river located in south-eastern Tasmania, Australia.

Course and features
The river rises below Moonlight Ridge in the Southwest National Park and flows generally east, joined by four minor tributaries and past the town of the same name before reaching its mouth and emptying into Hastings Bay, eventually flowing into the Tasman Sea. The river descends  over its  course.

See also

References

South East Tasmania
Rivers of Tasmania